The Potrerillos Formation is a geologic formation in Mexico. It preserves fossils dating back to the Early Paleocene period.

Description 
The Potrerillos Formation was subdivided into five members by McBride (1974), with the second highest, the Upper Mudstone Member. Foraminifera in the lower members indicate a Maastrichtian age, while fossils in the upper members indicate a Paleocene age. Fossil remains are abundant and include transported remains of corals, gastropods, bivalves, shark teeth, and bone fragments.

Fossil content 
The following fossils have been reported from the formation:
 Bivalves
 Venericardia (Baluchicardia) francescae
 Venericardia sp.
 Cephalopods
 Cimomia haltomi
 Elimia cf. trigemmata

See also 
 List of fossiliferous stratigraphic units in Mexico

References

Bibliography 
 

Geologic formations of Mexico
Maastrichtian Stage of North America
Paleocene Series of North America
Cretaceous Mexico
Paleogene Mexico
Cretaceous–Paleogene boundary
Mudstone formations
Shallow marine deposits
Tidal deposits
Paleontology in Mexico
Geography of Coahuila